This is a list of tallest buildings in Cincinnati, Ohio, U.S.

Tallest buildings
This includes spires and architectural details but does not include antenna masts. The buildings are in Downtown Cincinnati unless otherwise noted.

Buildings under construction
This lists buildings that are under construction in Cincinnati and are planned to rise at least .

Approved and proposed buildings
This lists buildings that are approved or proposed in Cincinnati and are planned to rise at least .

Tallest destroyed or demolished

References
Tallest skyscrapers in Cincinnati, Ohio-Emporis.com

Cincinnati
Tallest in Cincinnati

Buildings